Edwardsina gigantea or the giant torrent midge is a species of fly in family Blephariceridae. It is endemic to Australia.

References

Sources

Endangered fauna of Australia
Blephariceridae
Insects of Australia
Taxonomy articles created by Polbot
Insects described in 1977